Barsukynė ('badger place', formerly) is a village in Kėdainiai district municipality, in Kaunas County, in central Lithuania. According to the 2011 census, the village was uninhabited. There is no road or electricity in the village. A game butchery is next to the village.

Demography

References

Villages in Kaunas County
Kėdainiai District Municipality